Álvaro VII (Mpanzu-a-Mabondo) was king of the Kingdom of Congo from 1665 to 1666.

When the death of Antonio I at the Battle of Mbwila (October 29, 1665) was announced, a relative of the dead sovereign, Álvaro, was proclaimed king.

The new king sent a trusted Capuchin monk, Friar Girolamo of Montesarchio, to make peace with the Portuguese in to Luanda, Angola, in Christmas 1665. But the monk was waylaid by a rebellion in Mbamba, and only returned to the capital in June 1666, where he found Álvaro VII already dead; in the meantime, the powerful Count of Soyo, Paulo da Silva, had marched on São Salvador (the capital of the kingdom), killed the king and proclaimed Álvaro VIII in his place.

See also
List of Manikongo of Kongo
Kingdom of Kongo

Manikongo of Kongo
17th-century African people
1666 deaths